Cosne-d'Allier is a commune in the Allier department in central France.

Population

Sights
 Château de Petit-Bois

See also
Communes of the Allier department

References

Communes of Allier
Bourbonnais
Allier communes articles needing translation from French Wikipedia